Swimming at the 8th All-Africa Games was held October 5–11, 2003 in Abuja, Nigeria. 117 swimmers from 21 nations swam in the meet. Competition was held in a 50-meter (long course) pool.

The 2003 edition saw the addition to the Games program of the 50s of the strokes (Backstroke, Breaststroke and Butterfly), the Men's 800 Freestyle and the Women's 1500 Freestyle, bringing the total number of events to 40.

Results

Men

Women

Medal standings

References

Swimming at the African Games
2003 All-Africa Games
A
Swimming in Nigeria